BOD is a management consulting firm that works with mid-market enterprises. It was founded by Saurabh Uboweja in 2008. 

It started as a strategy led brand consultancy. On 12 July 2018, BOD announced its new positioning as "a management consulting firm marking their rapidly transforming role in client engagements". 

Previously working on brand creation and re-branding projects, it now offers three main lines of services to its clients - strategy consulting, implementation management and execution services - marking an expansion of its core offerings. It is also setting up an "in-house research & knowledge desk" which will publish reports that will guide the industry and help its own consulting teams in suggesting credible recommendations.

BOD has worked with "Founders, CXOs and Business Heads" across many sectors, including "Indian and international organisations such as Tata Group, Nokia, Walmart, ICICI Bank, Rivigo Logistics, ReNew Power and Medtronic."

In 2016, the firm entered the online education industry, and launched Branding Institute (BI) with 10 international branding experts on board.

Awards 
 November 2022: Transform Awards Asia 2022 for UltraTech Cement in the categories, "Best visual identity from the industrial and basic materials sector" (Gold), "Best use of packaging (other)" (Bronze) and "Best development of a new brand within an existing brand portfolio" (Highly Commended); Pradhanmantri Sangrahalaya (Ministry of Culture, Gov of India) in the categories, "Best visual identity from the public sector" (Silver) and "Best strategic or creative development of a new brand" (Bronze) and Zigly (Cosmo First Limited) in the categories, "Best use of a visual property" (Highly Commended), "Best use of copy style or tone of voice" (Highly Commended) and "Best strategic or creative development of a new brand" (Highly Commended)
 January 2021: Transform Awards Asia 2020 for Varuna Group in the categories, "Best visual identity from the transport and logistics sector" (Gold) and "Best brand architecture solution" (Gold)
2020: The Best Brand Awards Asia & Oceania for Pragyanam (Best Brand), Varuna Group (Bronze), SunSource (Award of Excellence), Dhanvantari Biosciences (Award of Excellence), Gradeup (Award of Excellence) and Yash Pakka (Award of Excellence)
November 2019: Transform Awards Asia-Pacific 2019 for Microlit in the category, "Best visual identity from the engineering and manufacturing sector" (Silver)
November 2018: Transform Awards Asia-Pacific 2018 for Excitel in the categories, "Best use of copy style/tone of voice" (Gold), "Best brand development project to reflect changed mission, values or positioning" (Bronze) and "Best visual identity from the technology, media and telecommunications sector" (Bronze)
May 2018: The Best Brand Awards for Early Learning Village (Gold 2018) along with Chuk (finalist), Brand India Summit (finalist) and World Sufi Forum (finalist)
 April 2014: Transform Europe Award 2014 for HIRA Group and Tata Power DDL, respectively in the categories, "Best Brand Consolidation" (Bronze) and "Best external stakeholder relations during a rebrand" (Highly Commended)

References 

Companies based in New Delhi
Consulting firms established in 2008
Indian companies established in 2008
Branding companies of India
Management consulting firms of India